The fifth season of the American reality talent show The Voice premiered on September 23, 2013 on NBC. Adam Levine and Blake Shelton returned as coaches for their fifth season, while CeeLo Green and Christina Aguilera returned after being replaced by Usher and Shakira in season four. This was the final season to feature Green as a coach.

This is the first season to extend the use of steals in the knockout round, which was previously made available only in the Battle rounds; and the Instant Save during live shows, allowing Twitter's tweets from the viewers (based on the airing of East Coast/Pacific time zones) to save a contestant eligible from elimination. The iTunes multiplier bonus introduced on season three also returned but the multiplier was reduced to five, which was still applied till this day.

Carson Daly returned to host the show, but Christina Milian did not return as the social media correspondent and Daly assumed the roles for both.

Tessanne Chin was announced as the winner of the season as the first foreign artist to win the show, and also marked Levine's second win as a coach.

Coaches and hosts
CeeLo Green and Christina Aguilera returned from their hiatus and rejoined Adam Levine and Blake Shelton. Usher and Shakira were confirmed to return for the following season. Carson Daly returned as host, but Christina Milian did not return as social media correspondent, as she wished to focus on her new album, and to compete on Season 17 of Dancing with the Stars. Daly then assumed the position as the social media correspondent.

In February 2014, Green announced his departure from The Voice and thus making it his last season for the show.

Auditions

The open call auditions were held in the following locations:

Teams
Color key

Blind auditions
The blind auditions were taped from July 9 to 12, 2013. The first episode of the Blind auditions premiered on September 23, 2013.

Color key

Episode 1 (Sept. 23)
The coaches performed "I Love Rock 'n' Roll" at the start of the show.

Episode 2 (Sept. 24)

Episode 3 (Sept. 30)

Episode 4 (Oct. 1)

Episode 5 (Oct. 7)

Episode 6 (Oct. 8)
Episode six feature a recap compilation of the "best of blind auditions," featuring the composition of the four teams, behind-the-scenes footage of the first five episodes, and a sneak peek of the battle rounds. 
A clip of the music video for Cassadee Pope's "Wasting All These Tears" was shown, to promote her debut album Frame by Frame, which was released on the same day.

The Battles
The Battle rounds (episodes 7 to 10) comprised two 2-hour episodes and two 1-hour episodes each on October 14, 15, 21 and 22, 2013 with six battles in each episode. The coaches once again utilized mentors during this round and each has enlisted the help of the following: Adam Levine brought in OneRepublic's lead singer, Ryan Tedder; CeeLo Green brought in Miguel; Christina Aguilera brought in Ed Sheeran; and finally, Blake Shelton brought in Cher. Continuing with the format introduced in Season three, the coaches can steal two losing artists from another coach.

Color key:

 Episodes airing on Monday had a running time of two hours.
 Episodes airing on Tuesday & Sunday had a running time of one hour.

The Knockouts
For the first time this series, steals are available to use during the Knockouts; each coach has one Steal to save any one losing artist from another coach. There were 16 Knockout matchups in two 2-hour episodes and only 20 artists advanced on to the Live Shows.

Color key:

Live shows
The live shows is the final phase of the competition. It consists of the playoffs, five weekly shows and the season finale.

Color key:

Week 1: Live playoffs (Nov. 4, 5 & 7)
Teams Adam and Blake performed in the Playoff round on November 4, with Teams CeeLo and Christina following November 5. The results were revealed November 7, with two artists from each team eliminated.

For this season, the iTunes voting rules saw revamps during the show's live rounds, where it now award the artists a multiplier of five (previously 10) for singles which charted within the Top 10 of the iTunes "Top 200 Singles Chart" at the close of a specific episode's voting "window" (generally from the end of the episode to 10 AM Eastern time the following morning).

This week's iTunes bonus multipliers were awarded to James Wolpert (#4); Caroline Pennell's performance did peaked at the Top 10 only after the voting window ended, thus the bonus was not applied.

Week 2: Top 12 (Nov 11 & 12)
The Top 12 performed on Monday, November 11, 2013 and received the results on Tuesday, November 12, 2013.

This is the first week (of the four weeks until the quarterfinals) to introduce Instant Save. During the designated/announced five-minute voting window, Twitter users (with public accounts only) may vote to save one artist in each week's bottom three by tweeting the artist's voting keyword along with the show's designated hashtag. Viewers in the Eastern and Central time zones vote during the live broadcasts, while viewers in the Mountain and Pacific time zones are cued to vote to save artists on the show's official Twitter account during the live East coast broadcast.

iTunes bonus multipliers were awarded to Matthew Schuler (#2); However, it later reached #1 after the Top 12 Recap show that aired before the Top 12 Results show and it remained in the iTunes Top 200 chart throughout the remainder of the season.

Week 3: Top 10 (Nov 18 & 19)
The Top 10 performed on Monday, November 18, with results following on Tuesday, November 19. None of the artists reached the top 10 on iTunes, so no bonuses were awarded.

Week 4: Top 8 (Nov 25 & 26)
The Top 8 performed on Monday, November 25, with results following on Tuesday, November 26.

Though all of the top eight artists charted within the iTunes top 100, the iTunes bonus multipliers was only awarded for Will Champlin (#5). With the elimination of Caroline Pennell, Green no longer has any artists on his team.

Week 5: Quarterfinals (Dec 2 & 3)
The Top 6 performed two songs each, one chosen by their coach and one chosen by them dedicated to someone in their lives, on Monday, December 2, 2013 with the results following on Tuesday, December 3.

With the advancement of Wolpert, Levine became the first coach with all three contestants advancing to the Semifinals in The Voice history.

Week 6: Semifinals (Dec 9 & 10)
The Top 5 performed on Monday, December 9, 2013 with the results following on Tuesday, December 10.

iTunes bonus multipliers was awarded to Tessanne Chin (#1), Jacquie Lee (#6), and Champlin (#10), with Chin becoming the first contestant to achieve the top chart position at the end of an applicable voting window this season. With the elimination of Cole Vosbury, Shelton no longer has any artists on his team, thus breaking his three-season winning streak, and also marked the first (and to date, the only) season in which Shelton does not have an artist representing him in the finale. In the results show, the top three finalists from Season 4 (Danielle Bradbery, Michelle Chamuel, and The Swon Brothers) made an appearance along with Season 3 winner Cassadee Pope.

Week 7: Finale (Dec 16 & 17)
The final performance show aired on Monday, December 16, 2013, with the winner declared on the following results show Tuesday, December 17. The final three artists performed a duet with their respective coaches, a solo song, and a reprisal song from Blind Auditions phase. While five songs reached the iTunes Top 10 (Tessanne Chin at #1 and #3, Jacquie Lee at #9, and Will Champlin #8 and #10), no “iTunes Bonus” was implemented, and does not affect the outcome of the results.

Elimination chart

Overall
Color key
Artist's info

Result details

Team
Color key
Artist's info

Result details

Performances by guests/coaches

Ratings
The fifth season premiered on September 23, 2013 and was watched by 14.98 million viewers with a 5.1 rating in the 18–49 demographic.  It was up from last season's premiere by 1.34 million viewers.

Artists' appearances in other media
 James Irwin and Matt Cermanski sang in the blind auditions for season four, but failed to turn any chairs.
 James Wolpert was among the Top 5 finalists in ABC's High School Musical: Get in the Picture.
 Shelbie Z later made the Top 24 on the fifteenth season of American Idol and was eliminated in the Semifinals.
 Josh Logan would later go on Season 1 of Songland.
 Manuel Romero, who failed to turn a chair, was on season 2 of America's Got Talent and was eliminated in the Semifinals.

References

External links
 
 The Voice (season 5) Episode Guide at NBC

Season 05
2013 American television seasons